Whonamedit? is an online English-language dictionary of medical eponyms and the people associated with their identification. Though it is a dictionary, many eponyms and persons are presented in extensive articles with comprehensive bibliographies. The dictionary is hosted in Norway and maintained by medical historian Ole Daniel Enersen.

References

External links

Medical websites
Medical dictionaries
Eponyms